Longwood, also known as Nutt's Folly, is a historic antebellum octagonal  mansion  located at 140 Lower Woodville Road in Natchez, Mississippi, United States. Built in part by enslaved people, the mansion is on the U.S. National Register of Historic Places, and is a National Historic Landmark. Longwood is the largest octagonal house in the United States.

Description and history
The mansion is known for its octagonal plan, byzantine onion-shaped dome, and the contrast between its ornately finished first floor and the unfinished upper floors.

Samuel Sloan, a Philadelphia architect, designed the home in 1859 for cotton planter Haller Nutt. Work was halted in 1861 at the start of the American Civil War. Nutt died of pneumonia in 1864, leaving the work incomplete. Of the 32 rooms planned for the house, only nine rooms on the basement floor were completed.

Haller Nutt's never-finished Natchez home, Longwood, was the last burst of Southern opulence before war and the federal ban on enslaving people brought the cotton barons' dominance to an end. Longwood survived decades of neglect and near-abandonment to become one of Natchez' most popular attractions.

Longwood is owned and operated as a historic house museum by the Pilgrimage Garden Club; it is also available for rent.

In popular culture
Longwood was featured in the Southern United States segment of Guide to Historic Homes of America, an in-depth production by Bob Vila for the A&E Network.

In 2010, Longwood was used in the HBO series True Blood, for the external shots of the fictional Jackson, Mississippi, mansion of Russell Edgington, the Vampire King of Mississippi and Louisiana.

See also
 List of National Historic Landmarks in Mississippi
 National Register of Historic Places listings in Adams County, Mississippi

References

External links

Stanton Hall & Longwood
Natchez Pilgrimage Tours - provides tours that include Longwood

Houses in Natchez, Mississippi
Octagon houses in the United States
Plantation houses in Mississippi
Historic house museums in Mississippi
Museums in Natchez, Mississippi
Houses completed in 1864
Houses on the National Register of Historic Places in Mississippi
National Historic Landmarks in Mississippi
Mississippi Landmarks
Historic American Buildings Survey in Mississippi
Antebellum architecture
Domes
Italianate architecture in Mississippi
Moorish Revival architecture in Mississippi
Villas in the United States
National Register of Historic Places in Natchez, Mississippi
Individually listed contributing properties to historic districts on the National Register in Mississippi